General elections were held for the first time in newly independent Liberia on 27 September 1847, alongside a constitutional referendum. The result was a victory for Governor Joseph Jenkins Roberts of the Pro-Administration Party, who defeated Samuel Benedict of the Anti-Administration Party. In a separate vote, Nathaniel Brander was elected Vice President.

Roberts was sworn into office as the country's first President on 3 January 1848, with Nathaniel Brander as vice president.

Campaign
Due to his part in the trial of Tobias Outland, who had murdered James Stevens in 1845, Benedict had faced condemnation across the electorate.

Results
In the presidential vote, Benedict received only ten votes.

In Montserrado County John B. Gripon and John N. Lewis were elected to the Senate whilst D. B. Brown, William Draper, J.B. McGill, and Daniel Bashiel Warner were elected to the House of Representatives.

References

Liberia
1847 in Liberia
Elections in Liberia
September 1847 events
Election and referendum articles with incomplete results